is a Japanese light novel series written by Reki Kawahara and illustrated by Shimeji. ASCII Media Works has published five volumes since June 2014. A manga adaptation drawn by Naoki Koshimizu was serialized in Dengeki Daioh. Yen Press has licensed the novels and manga in North America.

Plot
When Minoru Utsugi was eight years old, home invaders killed his parents and older sister while he hid in a cabinet. At 16, he still struggles with the trauma. Then mysterious alien orbs descend from the sky and take up residence inside some humans, granting them each a superpower that reflects their deepest desire. Minoru's power is the ability to protect himself inside an impenetrable shell. Some people gain a more active power, and not everyone uses their power for good.

Characters

Riri Isa
Oliver Saito
Denjirou Daimon (DD)

Media

Light novels

Manga

Reception
Yen Press' English edition of the first light novel volume received a positive review from Anime News Network. It was praised for its "believable characters" and the thought that "switching between the hero and villain's point of view really works." However, it was said that Shimeji's illustrations can make Takaesu (the antagonist of the first volume) "more wolf-like than shark-like in some images."

References

External links

2014 Japanese novels
Fiction set in 2019
Anime and manga based on light novels
ASCII Media Works manga
Dengeki Bunko
Dengeki Daioh
Kadokawa Dwango franchises
Fictional extraterrestrial life forms
Japanese science fiction novels
Light novels
Science fiction anime and manga
Shōnen manga
Fiction about superhuman features or abilities
Yen Press titles